Jorge Alberto Jacobson (25 February 1936 – 31 July 2014) was an Argentine radio and television journalist and newscaster. He was anchor of Telefe Noticias from 1997 to 2010 and as host in AM Del Plata, Radio 10 and Radio Continental.

References

1936 births
2014 deaths
People from Buenos Aires
Argentine television journalists
Argentine radio presenters
Argentine Jews